Abraham Shalom Yahuda (1877–1951) was a Palestinian Jew, polymath, teacher, writer, researcher, linguist, and collector of rare documents.

Biography
Abraham Shalom Yahuda was born in Jerusalem to a Jewish family originally from Baghdad. During his early life he studied under his brother Isaac Ezekial Yahuda. In 1895, at the age of fifteen, he wrote his first book (in Hebrew) entitled Arab Antiquities. Two years later, in 1897 he attended the First Zionist Congress in Basel, Switzerland. Afterwards he began teaching in Berlin from 1905 to 1914. Later, during the First World War, he relocated to Madrid where he was appointed in 1915, by royal decree, chair of rabbinic languages and literature After a fall-out with Chaim Weizmann over Zionist attitudes to Arabs, he joined Zeev Jabotinsky's Revisionist Zionist Movement, and was thereafter actively sponsored by the latter. Eventually Yahuda would relocate once again to New York and continue his career at the New School for Social Research.

During his lifetime Yahuda was a notable linguist and writer, translating and interpreting many ancient Arabic documents including various works of pre-Islamic poetry and medieval Judeo-Arabic texts. In 1935 he published The Accuracy of the Bible, a work which would spark a significant amount of international discussion.

His book  Dr. Weizmann's Errors on Trial was published posthumously in New York in 1952. This work was a scathing result of the slight he felt in being anonymously referred to in Chaim Weizmann's memoirs (Trial and Error: The Autobiography of Chaim Weizmann,) as a Spanish professor of marrano background.

Upon his death many of Yahuda's vast collection of rare documents were donated to the Jewish National and University Library, amounting to about fifteen hundred documents. Much of the donated material was of Arabic origin. However, several hundred items were in ancient Hebrew as well. Also included were a number of documents from other countries, including a number of illuminated manuscripts and unpublished documents penned by Sir Isaac Newton. The collection of 7,500 handwritten theological papers was granted recognition within UNESCO's "Memory of the World" registry, recognizing documents which should be preserved for future generations. Albert Einstein and Yahuda corresponded intensively throughout the 1930s. In 1940, Einstein arranged for Yahuda and his wife to travel to New York. Later that summer, Yahuda visited Einstein at Einstein's summer retreat in Lake Saranac in the Adirondack Mountains. Afterward, in September of the same year, Einstein sent a letter to Yahuda from his Lake Saranac retreat expressing his fascination for Newton's religious views and interpretations on the bible. Einstein's letter was likely inspired by his conversations with Yahuda at Lake Saranac.

Cultural influences
In his 1993 play Hysteria, British playwright Terry Johnson created a character partly based on Yahuda's attempt to convince Sigmund Freud not to publish his final book, Moses and Monotheism.

Other publications
 The Language of the Pentateuch in Its Relation to Egyptian (1933)

References

External links
Evri Yuval “Translating the Arab-Jewish Tradition: From al-Andalus to Palestine/Land of Israel” in Essays of the Forum Transregionale Studien, Berlin: forum-transregionale-studien 
Reeva Spector Simon, Michael Menachem Laskier, Sara Reguer.  The Jews of the Middle East and North Africa in Modern Times

1877 births
1951 deaths
Israeli Jews
People from Jerusalem
Translators from Arabic
The New School faculty
Israeli people of Iraqi-Jewish descent
Writers from Jerusalem
Jewish orientalists
Jewish writers
Israeli writers
Zionists
Revisionist Zionism
Israeli orientalists
Academic staff of the Complutense University of Madrid